Ten'edn, also known as Mos in Thailand and Tonga-Mos or just Tonga in some literature, is an aboriginal Mon–Khmer language spoken by the Maniq tribe of Thailand and Malaysia.

According to Benjamin (2012), Maniq (Məniʔ, Maniʔ) can refer to the following three or more speech varieties:
Tonga' (Toŋaʔ)
Mos (Mɔs)
Teanean (Ten'en, Tɛnʔɛn, Tean-ean)

Sample vocabulary
Here are some odour terms in Maniq:

See also
 Jahai language

References

Sources

External links 
http://projekt.ht.lu.se/rwaai RWAAI (Repository and Workspace for Austroasiatic Intangible Heritage)
http://hdl.handle.net/10050/00-0000-0000-0003-66FA-7@view Maniq in RWAAI Digital Archive

Languages of Malaysia
Languages of Thailand
Aslian languages